Kledi Kadiu (born 28 October 2003) is an Albanian swimmer. He competed in the men's 100 metre freestyle at the 2020 Summer Olympics.

References

External links
 

2003 births
Living people
Albanian male swimmers
Albanian male freestyle swimmers
Olympic swimmers of Albania
Swimmers at the 2020 Summer Olympics
Place of birth missing (living people)
21st-century Albanian people